The Lundell Settlement was the result of a class action taken against Dell Computers regarding design flaws on the company's Inspiron 5150 notebook computer.  It was filed in September 2005, and was officially settled in December 2006.  There were a number of design flaws in this model, ranging from flaws in the cooling system of the notebook to a tab on the "C" panel pressing on the motherboard.  In all, the design flaws caused the notebook to shut down suddenly or not to boot at all.

References

External links
 Forum regarding tab on C panel problem with quick fixes

Computing-related controversies and disputes
Class action lawsuits